is a Japanese politician of the Liberal Democratic Party, a member of the House of Councillors in the Diet (national legislature). A native of Hayato, Kagoshima and high school graduate, he was elected for the first time in 2004.

References

External links 
  in Japanese.

1943 births
Living people
Members of the House of Councillors (Japan)
Liberal Democratic Party (Japan) politicians